This is a list of films that are or have been at one time or another banned in the United States; including films banned in some American cities or states.

List

See also
 List of banned films
 Cinema of the United States
 Film censorship in the United States

References

 Banned
United States
Banned
 List United States